Breeze from the East is a 1964 album by vibraphonist Cal Tjader, arranged by Stan Applebaum. The album features jazzy lounge music with a quasi-Asian sound.

Reception

Stephen Cook reviewed the album for Allmusic and described the album as combining "the vibist's [Tjader's] Latin lounge style with kitschy Asian touches" describing the songs "Sake and Greens," "Cha," and "Shoji" as sounding like "'60s-era James Bond on a wild chase through the heart of Tokyo". Cook concluded by feeling that "The ultra-smooth Latin jazz sound Tjader favored has always been more infectious than demanding and Breeze from the East's commercialized mod/eastern elements only end up expanding the pop exotica mix".

Track listing 
 "Sake and Greens" (Stan Applebaum) – 2:24
 "Cha" (Applebaum) – 3:03
 "Leyte" (Cal Tjader, Lonnie Hewitt) – 3:00
 "Shoji" (Applebaum) – 2:33
 "China Nights" (Nobuyuki Takeoka, Sedores, Yaso Saijo) – 2:28
 "Fuji" (Tjader) – 2:23
 "Black Orchid" (Tjader) – 3:04
 "Theme from Burke's Law" (Herschel Burke Gilbert) – 2:37
 "Stardust" (Hoagy Carmichael, Mitchell Parish) – 2:45
 "Poinciana" (Buddy Bernier, Nat Simon) – 3:23
 "East of the Sun (and West of the Moon)" (Brooks Bowman) – 2:23

Personnel 
Cal Tjader – vibraphone
Stan Applebaum – arranger, celesta
George Duvivier – double bass
Jerry Dodgion – flute
Dick Hyman – electronic organ
Lonnie Hewitt – piano
Willie Bobo – percussion
Johnny Rae – drums
Production
John Murello – cover design
Phil Ramone – engineer
Val Valentin – director of engineering
Al "Jazzbo" Collins, Jack Maher – liner notes
Creed Taylor – producer

References

1963 albums
Cal Tjader albums
Verve Records albums